The Anti-Communist Labor Union of the Philippines was a Filipino trade union organization. It was formed in the late 1930s, as a regroupment by conservative labour leaders. Its leaders included Ruperto Cristobal, Aurelio Intertas and Pedro Fernandez. One of the few public actions of the organization was to send a delegation to the Anti-Communist Conference in Tokyo, consisting of Jose I. Baluyot and Aurelio Alvero (Cristobal was scheduled to attend, but could not travel).

References

Trade unions in the Philippines
Trade unions established in the 1930s
Anti-communist organizations in the Philippines